is a football manager and former player who played as a forward.

Born in Brazil, Lopes is a naturalised Japanese citizen and represented their national team on 20 occasions. After retiring he took up coaching, mainly working in both his home and footballing countries.

Club career
Lopes was born in Franca, São Paulo and represented São Paulo FC as a youth. In 1987, after two years as a senior, he moved to Japan and signed with Japan Soccer League club Nissan Motors. From 1988 to 1990, the club won all three major titles in Japan; Japan Soccer League, JSL Cup and Emperor's Cup two years in a row.

Lopes moved to Hitachi (later Kashiwa Reysol) in 1990. In 1992, Japan Soccer League was folded and the club joined the new Japan Football League (JFL). The club won 2nd place in 1994 and secured promotion to the J1 League.

In 1994, after Kashiwa signed Müller, Lopes left the club. He joined JFL club Honda in 1995 where he was top scorer for two years in a row (1995-1996). He moved to J1 League club Bellmare Hiratsuka in 1997, playing with Hidetoshi Nakata and scoring regularly. However, he left the club end of 1998 season due to financial strain and moved to Nagoya Grampus Eight, winning the 1999 Emperor's Cup.

Toward the end of his career, Lopes played for FC Tokyo (2001) and Avispa Fukuoka (2001–02). He retired at the end of the 2002 season.

International career
In September 1997, Lopes obtained Japanese citizenship. Immediately after this, he was called up to the Japan national team for the 1998 World Cup qualifiers. On 28 September, he made his national team debut against South Korea.

Lopes went on to play six games and scored three goals to help Japan qualify for their first ever FIFA World Cup. At the 1998 World Cup, he played all three matches, assisting Masashi Nakayama in Japan's first ever World Cup against Jamaica. He also played at the 1999 Copa America and scored twice.

Lopes played 20 games and scored five goals for Japan until 1999.

Managerial career
Lopes started his career as Vágner Mancini's assistant at Paulista in 2005, helping the club win their first-ever national title, the 2005 Copa do Brasil. He left the club in 2007 due to health problems, but returned in December 2009. Initially an interim for the 2010 season, he was definitely appointed manager on 23 February. In May, he resigned and was subsequently appointed manager of Pão de Açúcar Esporte Clube.

Lopes returned to Paulista in 2011, winning the year's Copa Paulista before returning to Japan and being named Gamba Osaka's assistant manager in 2012. In October 2012, he was presented as manager of Comercial-SP manager for the ensuing campaign. In that season, he also managed São Bernardo.

In the 2014 campaign, Lopes was in charge of Botafogo-SP, Criciúma and Atlético Goianiense. In the following year, he took over Goiás and Bragantino.

Career statistics

Club

International 

Scores and results list Japan's goal tally first, score column indicates score after each Lopes goal.

Managerial statistics

Honours

Player
São Paulo
Campeonato Paulista: 1985, 1987

Nissan Motors
Japan Soccer League: 1988–89, 1989–90
JSL Cup: 1988, 1989, 1990
Emperor's Cup: 1988, 1989

Nagoya Grampus
Emperor's Cup: 1999

Manager
Paulista
Copa Paulista: 2011

Atlético Goianiense
Campeonato Goiano: 2019

Individual
Asian Goal of the Month: November 1997

Notes

References

External links
 
 
 Japan National Football Team Database
 
 

1969 births
Living people
Brazilian emigrants to Japan
Japanese footballers
Brazilian footballers
Japanese football managers
Japanese expatriate football managers
Naturalized citizens of Japan
Japan international footballers
Expatriate footballers in Brazil
Expatriate football managers in Brazil
People from Franca
Association football forwards
Japan Soccer League players
J1 League players
J2 League players
Japan Football League (1992–1998) players
1998 FIFA World Cup players
1999 Copa América players
Campeonato Brasileiro Série A managers
Campeonato Brasileiro Série B managers
J1 League managers
São Paulo FC players
Yokohama F. Marinos players
Kashiwa Reysol players
Honda FC players
Shonan Bellmare players
Nagoya Grampus players
FC Tokyo players
Avispa Fukuoka players
Paulista Futebol Clube managers
Grêmio Osasco Audax Esporte Clube managers
Comercial Futebol Clube (Ribeirão Preto) managers
São Bernardo Futebol Clube managers
Botafogo Futebol Clube (SP) managers
Criciúma Esporte Clube managers
Atlético Clube Goianiense managers
Clube Atlético Bragantino managers
Goiás Esporte Clube managers
Sampaio Corrêa Futebol Clube managers
Paraná Clube managers
Vila Nova Futebol Clube managers
Albirex Niigata managers
Esporte Clube Vitória managers
Footballers from São Paulo (state)